Bulungu is a community in the Kwilu Province of the Democratic Republic of the Congo.
The town lies on the southwestern bank of the Kwilu River, downstream from Kikwit. Bulungu is the headquarters of the Bulungu Territory.
As of 2012 the population was estimated to be 57,168.

Climate 
Köppen-Geiger climate classification system classifies its climate as tropical wet and dry (Aw).

<div style="width:55%">

References
  

Populated places in Kwilu Province